The Cuba national under-18 baseball team is the national under-18 team representing Cuba in international baseball competitions. The organization is currently ranked 9th in the world by the World Baseball Softball Confederation.  They compete in the bi-annual U-18 Baseball World Cup. They have won the tournament a leading 11 times.

See also
 Cuba national baseball team
 Baseball Federation of Cuba
 U-18 Baseball World Cup

References

National under-18
National under-18 baseball teams
Baseball